Farah Nayeri is an Iranian-born author and journalist based in London. Her 2022 book, Takedown, focuses on the changing landscape of art activism and visual art amid #MeToo, Black Lives Matter and other changes to the art world dating back to political censorship of art in the 1980s in the United States. Nayeri hosts the Culture Blast podcast and frequently writes for the New York Times, among other publications, and chapters in Takedown refer back to her previous writings, such as those on the new look at Paul Gauguin through the lens of today's world.

Books
Takedown: Art and Power in the Digital Age (Astra House, 2022)

References

External links

British writers

British journalists

Living people

Year of birth missing (living people)